Paula Atherton is an American jazz saxophonist.

Career
Born and raised in Massapequa Park, Long Island, NY, Atherton began playing the flute at the age of nine and then the saxophone during her teen years. She became further interested in jazz soon afterwards. As a jazz vocalist/musician, Atherton was influenced by artists such as Billie Holiday, Charlie Parker, Cannonball Adderley and David Sanborn.

Discography

Singles

Credits

References

American jazz saxophonists
Year of birth missing (living people)
Living people
Women jazz saxophonists